Maurice Patrick Sheehy (12 June 1893 – 10 January 1961) was an Australian politician, and a member of the Victorian Legislative Council for Melbourne Province. As a young man, "Maurie" Sheehy (as he was then known) was an Australian rules footballer who played for Collingwood in the Victorian Football League (VFL). As an older gentleman, Sheehy was a politician, better known as Patrick Sheehy.

Sports notoriety
Sheehy began his sports career at Collingwood in 1914. After just two games he crossed to Fairfield where he spent the 1915 football season. The Northcote District recruit returned to Collingwood the following year and went on to appear in four Grand Finals. A back pocket in their 1919 premiership team, Sheehy also participated in the club's losing 1918, 1920 and 1922 Grand Final sides. He left Collingwood to coach Northcote in 1923.

Political career
Sheehy joined the Labor Party in 1911. He was a Richmond, Australia city councillor (1934–1956); and twice mayor (from 1941 to 1942 and 1951–52).

Sheehy had also contested the federal seat of Kooyong as the Australian Labor Party candidate in 1951, losing to the incumbent Robert Menzies.

Sheehy was elected to the Victorian State Legislative Council for the seat of Melbourne in June 1952, and served until his defeat in June 1958.  He represented the Labor Party from 21 June 1952 until March 1955. When the party split in March 1955, Sheehy became a member of the Democratic Labor Party (or the Australian Labor Party (Anti-Communist) as it was originally known) until his defeat on 20 June 1958.

Sheehy was a Melbourne and Metropolitan Board of Works Commissioner from 1950 until 1956, and he also served for a time as a member of the Richmond Girls' Secondary School Council.

References

Further reading
Holmesby, Russell and Main, Jim (2007). The Encyclopedia of AFL Footballers. 7th ed. Melbourne: Bas Publishing.

External links

Re-member – A database of all Victorian MPs since 1851

1893 births
1961 deaths
Australian rules footballers from Melbourne
Collingwood Football Club players
Collingwood Football Club Premiership players
Northcote Football Club players
Northcote Football Club coaches
Members of the Victorian Legislative Council
Australian Labor Party members of the Parliament of Victoria
Democratic Labor Party (historical) politicians
Victoria (Australia) state politicians
Australian sportsperson-politicians
Australian Labor Party (Anti-Communist) members of the Parliament of Victoria
20th-century Australian politicians
One-time VFL/AFL Premiership players
People from Fairfield, Victoria
Politicians from Melbourne